, is a Buddhist temple in the city of Nara, Japan.

Hokke-ji was built by Empress Kōmyō in 745, originally as a nunnery temple on the grounds where her father Fujiwara no Fuhito's mansion stood. According to records kept by the temple, the initial construction went on until around 782. It once had a large complex with several halls, gates, and two pagodas.

Hokke-ji was heavily damaged in the fierce Siege of Nara in 1180. The complex was restored in the 12th and 13th centuries, but was again affected by civil conflicts during the Sengoku period.

The current main hall, bell tower and the south gate are reconstructions of the 16th century, sponsored by Toyotomi Hideyori and his mother, Lady Yodo.

The temple's main worship statue is the wooden 11-faced Kannon, a National Treasure. The temple houses an ancient bath building, originally built by Empress Kōmyō, which she opened to the public.

See also 
 For an explanation of terms concerning Japanese Buddhism, Japanese Buddhist art, and Japanese Buddhist temple architecture, see the Glossary of Japanese Buddhism. 
List of National Treasures of Japan (paintings)
List of National Treasures of Japan (sculptures)

Further reading
Lori Meeks, Hokkeji and the Reemergence of Female Monastic Orders in Premodern Japan (2010) excerpt and text search

External links 
Hokke-ji homepage 

Buddhist temples in Nara, Nara
Religious organizations established in the 8th century
Important Cultural Properties of Japan
Places of Scenic Beauty
Nara period
Historic Sites of Japan
Monzeki